The 2009 National Hockey League All-Star Game was held at the Bell Centre in Montreal, home of the Montreal Canadiens, in conjunction with the Montreal Canadiens centennial celebrations on Sunday evening, January 25, 2009. The game was held between two teams, each representing a conference (Eastern and Western) of the National Hockey League (NHL). The Eastern Conference team won the game 12–11, decided by shootout.

The game was part of a weekend of activities. On Saturday, a game featuring NHL rookies and sophomores preceded a skills competition among the NHL players, called the NHL All-Star Game SuperSkills Competition. In a first for the All-Star Game, the "Breakaway Challenge," a part of the skills competition, had fans voting for the winner using their mobile phones, with the real-time voting results posted on the NHL's website. The game was preceded by a circus arts display and a concert was held between the second and third periods.

Skills Competition 
Unlike previous years, the Skills Competition did not have players playing on the behalf of their respective conferences (thus, there was no conference-based scoring) and the team-based Obstacle Course was removed. In addition, YoungStars players became eligible to play in the Fastest Skater, Hardest Shot, Shooting Accuracy, and Breakaway Challenge events.

In reaction to the changed format for the skills competition the year before, the Fastest Skater event reverted to the traditional one-lap format. The breakaway challenge used Jason Maggio, a local minor hockey goaltender defending the goal (to answer criticisms that the all-star goaltenders simply poke-checked the players as they were making the shot) as well as the player being able to take as many shots as possible in one minute (instead of only one shot). Finally, instead of being a judged competition, the breakaway challenge allowed the public to vote for the winner via text messaging. The public chose Alexander Ovechkin, whose highlight was a shot using two sticks while wearing a series of props provided by Evgeni Malkin, by a landslide, with 47% of the votes. Malkin won the shooting accuracy over Dany Heatley in a sudden death shoot-off after both scored 4-for-4 in the preliminaries. Malkin shot 3-4, missing the last target, while Heatley hit his first two but missed on the third. Andrew Cogliano walked off as the winner of the Fastest Skater competition.

The Hardest Shot competition was played for charity, with each competitor contributing $1,000, to be matched by their team and the league, as well as the National Hockey League Players' Association (NHLPA), for a total of $24,000 to the charity chosen by the winner of the competition. Zdeno Chara won the event, with a record 105.4 mph shot (eclipsing Al Iafrate, who had set the record the last time the All-Star game was in Montreal). The Elimination Shootout involved all 40 skaters (but only four of the six goaltenders – leaving Roberto Luongo as the only player to not participate in any of the skills events), with the goaltenders being able to choose which skaters they will face off against. The field was narrowed from 40 to just 12 after one round, and Shane Doan eventually outlasted Marc Savard after seven rounds (including two rounds in which none of the three remaining players — Doan, Savard nor Milan Hejduk — scored).

YoungStars Game 
For the first time, the YoungStars game, part of the Skills Competition featured a three-on-three rookies versus sophomores format, consisting of three six-minute periods with the clock stopping only within the last minute of each game. Coaching the rookies was Luc Robitaille and for the sophomores was Pete Mahovlich. Unlike the previous All-Star Game, YoungStars goaltenders were named prior to the game, though sophomore goaltender Carey Price volunteered to do double duty after Erik Ersberg withdrew from the game due to injury. The game saw rookie goaltender Pekka Rinne (who replaced Steve Mason) make 20 saves in a 9–5 victory for the rookies.  Rookie Blake Wheeler was named the MVP of the YoungStars game after scoring four goals.

Roster 

 Milan Lucic was named to the YoungStars game, but did not play.
 Erik Ersberg was named to the YoungStars game, but did not play.
 Steve Mason was named to the YoungStars game, but did not play
 Nicklas Backstrom was named to the YoungStars game, but did not play.

Absentee punishment 
Due to a growing number of otherwise healthy players choosing to skip the All-Star Game to rest, the NHL began to enforce the understanding that players that are named to the event must participate in some capacity. Those who choose not to participate must miss a game, either before the Game or after. Players named to the YoungStars game will not be subject to this policy, as their consent is required for participation. Thus, because Detroit Red Wings players Pavel Datsyuk and Nicklas Lidström declined to attend the festivities due to injury, they were each forced to miss one regular season game. Sidney Crosby, who was also ruled out due to injury, participated in off-ice activities and was not forced to miss a game.

Rosters 
Fan voting for the All-Star Game starting line-up was closed on January 2, 2009. The rosters were announced on January 3 by retired Canadian Hockey Hall of Fame player Jean Beliveau, who played in 13 All-Star games during his career.

Referees:  Marc Joannette and  Brad Meier
Linesmen:  Greg Devorski and  Pierre Racicot

Notes 

Nicklas Lidstrom was named to the Western Conference All-Star Team, but chose not to play. Stephane Robidas was named as his replacement.
Pavel Datsyuk was named to the Western Conference All-Star Team, but was unable to play due to injury. Patrick Marleau was named as his replacement.
Sidney Crosby was voted into the starting lineup for the Eastern Conference All-Star Team, but was unable to play due to injury. Martin St. Louis was named as his replacement on the roster and Vincent Lecavalier as his replacement in the starting lineup.

Uniforms 
Replacing the prototypical Reebok Edge design of the previous two games, the 2009 All-Star Game featured a unique design inspired by the Canadiens, featuring the host team's colors of bleu, blanc et rouge. The Eastern Conference team's jerseys were primarily red, while the Western Conference wore white. The uniform featured an asymmetrical design, with a contrasting color stripe coming down one side of the body of the uniform and wrapping around at the waistline. One sleeve on each jersey featured three stars with the years 1969, 1975, and 1993 on them, representing the three previous times the Canadiens had hosted the All-Star Game since the league dropped the Stanley Cup Champions vs. NHL All-Stars format.

Summary 

W - Tim Thomas L - Roberto Luongo

Features 
A pre-game performance featured acrobatics and music by circus arts group Cirque Eloize. The U.S. national anthem was sung by Alan Prater and the Canadian national anthem was performed by the Montreal Jubilation Gospel Choir, under the direction of its founder Trevor Payne. Simple Plan and Marie-Mai performed during the intermission.

References

External links 
All-Star Game website at NHL.com

All
National Hockey League All-Star Games
Ice hockey competitions in Montreal
2009 in Quebec
2009 in Canadian sports